The 14th Separate Mechanized Brigade named after Prince Roman the Great, is a unit of the Ukrainian Ground Forces formed in December 2014. It is based in Volodymyr as part of Operational Command West. The brigade has been actively participating in the ongoing conflict in eastern Ukraine, as a result of the Russian invasion in 2022.

History 
The 14th Mechanized Brigade was established on December 1, 2014 in Volodymyr, Ukraine and was led by Colonel Oleksandr Zhakun. The brigade was formed from the remains of the 51st Mechanized Brigade and new personnel. The brigade included a reactive artillery battalion, a tank battalion with new tanks from the Lviv Tank Factory, an antitank battery, and a repair battalion. The 1st Territorial Defence Battalion "Volyn" joined the brigade as the 99th Separate Mechanized Infantry Battalion. The brigade was sent to defend Krasnohorivka and Marinka in the Donbas region in June 2015. In July 2017, the brigade participated in military exercises in Luhansk region using the UR-77 remote demining technique. On October 14, 2019, the brigade was granted the honorific "Roman the Great."

The 14th Separate Mechanized Brigade was involved in several battles in the Russian war against Ukraine conflict. On March 8, 2022, its tank crews destroyed six Russian tanks in the battle of Makariv. In the same battle, three crew members were killed. On April 13, 2022, the brigade used Bayraktar drones to correct fire on a Russian military column, attacking it with 122mm 21-gerbral volley reactive fire systems. President Volodymyr Zelenskyy recognized the 14th Separate Mechanized Brigade for its contribution to the Kharkiv offensive, which resulted in the capture of Kupiansk and the cities of Velykyi Burluk and Vovchansk near the Ukrainian-Russian border. The brigade was involved in a pincer attack that led to the capture of Hnylytsa and Artemivka along the Donets.

Current Structure 
As of 2023 the brigade's structure is as follows:

 14th Separate Mechanized Brigade, Volodymyr
 Brigade Headquarters and HQ Company
 Tank Battalion
 1st Motorized Battalion
 1st Mechanized Battalion
 2nd Mechanized Battalion
 3rd Mechanized Battalion
 Artillery Group
 Reconnaissance Company
 Anti-Aircraft Company
 Support units

References 

Mechanised infantry brigades of Ukraine
Military units and formations established in 2014
Military units and formations of Ukraine in the war in Donbas